Electoral District of Drayton and Toowoomba was the original seat for the urban settlement on the eastern Darling Downs, Queensland, Australia.

History
Drayton and Toowoomba had 2 incarnations: 1859 to 1873 and 1878 to 1912.

Its first incarnation was as one of original sixteen electorates created in 1859, when Queensland became an independent colony. It was represented by one member. In 1873, its name was changed to electoral district of Toowoomba.

Its second incarnation was in 1878, when Toowoomba was renamed back to Drayton and Toowoomba. It became a 2-member electorate at that time. In 1912, it was redistributed into  Drayton (1912–1927), Toowoomba (1912–1960) and East Toowoomba (1912–1950).

The seat is notable for Member and perennial Toowoomba Mayor William Henry Groom who went on to be the region's representative at the first Commonwealth Parliament in 1901.

Members for Drayton and Toowoomba
The table of members elected in Drayton and Toowoomba appears below.

 First incarnation

 Second incarnation

See also
 Electoral districts of Queensland
 Members of the Queensland Legislative Assembly by year
 :Category:Members of the Queensland Legislative Assembly by name

References

Darling Downs
Toowoomba
Former electoral districts of Queensland